Peter Westberg (born 22 September 1995) is a Swedish footballer who plays for Gjøvik-Lyn as a midfielder.

References

External links

 (archive)

1995 births
Living people
Association football midfielders
Kalmar FF players
Swedish footballers
Allsvenskan players
Sportspeople from Gotland County